The 2019 Nigerian House of Representatives elections in Imo State was held on February 23, 2019, to elect members of the House of Representatives to represent Imo State, Nigeria.

Overview

Summary

References 

Imo State House of Representatives elections
House of Representatives
Imo